D44 is a state road connecting A9 motorway Nova Vas interchange to A8 expressway Lupoglav interchange via Buzet.

The road also provides connections to numerous towns and cities in central Istria, most notably to Lupoglav, Buzet, Motovun either directly or via numerous roads connecting to D44. Prior to construction of A8 motorway, D44 was the main east-west road communication in the northern Istria, serving touristic resorts in the northern part of Istria.

The road, as well as all other state roads in Croatia, is managed and maintained by Hrvatske ceste, a state-owned company.

Traffic volume 

Traffic is regularly counted and reported by Hrvatske ceste, operator of the road. Substantial variations between annual (AADT) and summer (ASDT) traffic volumes are attributed to the fact that the road connects to A8 motorway carrying substantial tourist traffic.

Road junctions and populated areas

Maps

Sources

External links
 Bina-Istra

D044
D044